The Henschel Hs 126 was a German two-seat reconnaissance and observation aircraft of World War II that was derived from the Henschel Hs 122. The pilot was seated in a protected cockpit under the parasol wing and the gunner in an open rear cockpit. The prototype aircraft frame was that of a Hs 122A fitted with a Junkers engine. The Hs 126 was well received for its good short takeoff and low-speed characteristics which were needed at the time. It was put into service for a few years, but was soon superseded by the general-purpose, STOL Fieseler Fi 156 Storch and the medium-range Focke-Wulf Fw 189 "flying eye".

Development
The first prototype was not entirely up to Luftwaffe standards; it was followed by two more development planes equipped with different engines. Following the third prototype, ten pre-production planes were built in 1937. The Hs 126 entered service in 1938 after operational evaluation with the Legion Condor contingent to the Spanish Civil War.

Operational history
By the time the Hs 126 A-1 joined the Luftwaffe, the re-equipping of reconnaissance formations was already well advanced. By the start of World War II in September 1939, the Hs 126 served with Aufkl.Gr 10, 11, 12, 13, 14, 21, 23, 31, 32 und 41. They were used with great success in the attack on Poland where it proved itself as a reliable observation and liaison aircraft. Its use continued after the end of the Phony War in May 1940. It suffered some losses when intercepted by Allied fighter aircraft: 20 Hs 126s were lost between 10 and 21 May 1940.

Its successor, the Focke-Wulf Fw 189 entered service in 1940 but the Hs 126 remained the main short range reconnaissance aircraft until 1942. 47 squadrons equipped with Hs 126s participated in the invasion of the Soviet Union in 1941. The Hs 126 was also used in North Africa, such as with the 2./Aufklärungsgruppe (H)/14 which used the type until the end of 1942.

Late in the war, it was used in glider tug and night ground attack roles, but production of the Hs 126 ended in 1941 and the type was retired from the front line in 1942.

On 12 September 1943 Henschel 126s were used to tow 10 DFS 230 attack gliders from Pratica Di Mare airfield near Rome to the Gran Sasso on a raid to rescue Benito Mussolini. Mussolini had been imprisoned there after being deposed by the Grand Council of Fascism, followed by a decree from the King of Italy. The Henschel was a smaller tow plane compared the usual Junkers Ju 52 three-engine tow plane and struggled to gain altitude to clear the mountains on the way. This led to confusion when the lead Kette of three gliders turned to gain altitude allowing Otto Skorzeny's group of three gliders to assume the lead.

Greece 
At the outbreak of Greco-Italian War of 1940–41, the Royal Hellenic Air Force (Ellinikí Vasilikí Aeroporía, RHAF) had in service 16 Henschels, with 3 Observation Mira, under III Corps, based in Thessaloniki and Veria. Two days after the start of the war, on 30 October, there was the first air battle between Italian Regia Aeronautica and the RHAF when some Henschel Hs 126 of 3/2 Flight from 3 Observation Mira took off to locate Italian Army columns. But they were intercepted and attacked by Fiat CR.42s of 393a Squadriglia. A first Henschel was hit and crashed, killing its observer, Pilot Officer Evanghelos Giannaris, the first Greek aviator to die in the war. A second Hs 126 was downed over Mount Smolikas, killing Pilot Officer Lazaros Papamichail and Sergeant Constantine Yemenetzis.

Operators
 Estonian Air Force
 Luftwaffe
 Royal Hellenic Air Force
 Spanish State Spanish Air Force

Specifications (Hs 126 B-1)

See also

References

Notes

Bibliography
 Carr, John, On Spartan Wings, Barnsley, SY: Pens & Sword Military, 2012. .
 Gerdessen, Frederik. "Estonian Air Power 1918 – 1945". Air Enthusiast, No. 18, April – July 1982. pp. 61–76. .
 Gerdessen, F. Versatile Informer in Estonia. Air Enthusiast 105, May/June 2003, p. 76. 
 Green, William. Warplanes of the Third Reich. London: Macdonald and Jane's Publishers, 1970 (fourth impression 1979). .

 Luranc, Zbigniew. Henschel Hs 126 - Skrzydła w Miniaturze (in Polish). Gdańsk, Poland: Wydawnictwo Avia-Press, 1995. .
 Nowarra, Heinz J. Nahaufklärer, 1910-1945: Die Augen des Heeres (in German). Stuttgart, Germany: Motorbuch Verlag, 1981. .
 Pęczkowski, Robert and Robert Panek. Henschel Hs 126. Sandomierz, Poland/Redbourn, UK: Mushroom Model Publications, 2008. .
 Smith, J. Richard and Anthony Kay. German Aircraft of the Second World War. London: Putnam & Company, 1972 (third impression 1978). .
 Wood, Tony and Bill Gunston. Hitler's Luftwaffe: A Pictorial History and Technical Encyclopedia of Hitler's Air Power in World War II. London: Salamander Books Ltd., 1977. .

Hs 126
1930s German military reconnaissance aircraft
Single-engined tractor aircraft
Parasol-wing aircraft
World War II reconnaissance aircraft of Germany
Aircraft first flown in 1936